Carlton Leach  is an author, occasional actor, and a former criminal.

Early life 

Leach was born in Canning Town. A fan of West Ham United F.C., he became involved in the Inter City Firm, a gang of hooligans who followed the East London club. Leach was the original model for the cover of the Strength Thru Oi! album.

Criminal career 

Leach started work as a bouncer in East London, where he became involved with Tony  Tucker, then Pat Tate, both of whom worked as large scale dealers in ecstasy during the rave era in the late 1980s. Tate, Tucker and Craig Rolfe were shot dead in December 1995 in a Range Rover on a farm track in Rettendon, in the Rettendon murders.

Later career 

In 2003 Carlton Leach wrote a memoir about his criminal exploits, entitled Muscle. In 2007 a film based on the book was released, entitled Rise of the Footsoldier and starring Ricci Harnett as Leach. In 2015, Leach worked with Harnett to organise another film about his life, Reign of the General, but after losing a legal battle over copyright, the film was taken over by the owners of Rise of the Footsoldier and released. The same people went on to make a third film in the franchise in 2017. Leach claimed to have no part in the film, and commented on Twitter that it was fictional and no longer his story. In 2021, Carlton decided to release what he called his last (autobiographical) book. Co authored with Jason Allday, the book Titled,"The Final Say" went to number 1 on Amazon's best seller list within 24 hours of release. It has been said that the book is, "more than Essex and the same old......" as it covers Carlton's life from childhood until now; including references and contributions from his family and friends.

References 

Living people
English memoirists
Organized crime memoirists
People from Canning Town
English criminals
Association football supporters
Former hooligans
Year of birth missing (living people)